FuelRod is a brand of USB battery chargers obtainable and swappable at vending machines at airports, malls, and theme parks.

History 
FuelRod was developed by Chi Yau and Joe Yeagley as a mobile battery charger for use while traveling. In October 2014, they launched the first "swap box" at San Diego International Airport.

Locations 
, FuelRod has vending machines in over 28 airports. They also have vending machines in Disneyland and Disney World. In July 2019, FuelRod  expanded mobile charging kiosks to Orlando airport. In 2021, Penn State also placed portable charging kiosks around the campus.

Technology 
The FuelRod device is a standard cylindrical USB power bank, based on an 18650 lithium polymer cell. Such devices are now commonplace and may be purchased in a range of qualities, from dollar stores and high-end retailers. Older FuelRods don’t have a capacity marked on them, but have been checked to 2,600 mAh. Newer revisions seem to confirm this, as they are marked 2,600 mAh on the bottom. This would be a typical capacity for a bank with a single 18650.

Business model 
FuelRod have two business transactions with their users. They sell the FuelRod Kit, either by vending machines in popular locations, such as transport hubs and theme parks, or online.  Secondly these vending machines or 'swap boxes' also allow the user's depleted powerbank to be exchanged for a freshly charged powerbank, previously for free.

FuelRods have a purchase price of $20–30, depending on location. Other brands vary widely in price, but some are cheaper than this, or a powerbank at a similar price can have a much greater capacity and larger form factor. Swapping a FuelRod is most usually free, although a fee may sometimes be charged. FuelRod's business model involves making a profit from the sale of the initial unit, and using this to cross-subsidise the swapping service. The premium pricing for the consumer is justified by the added convenience and the ability to swap for a Fresh fully charged FuelRod. However, this convenience has been questioned, given the small capacity of the bank and the likelihood of using multiple banks in a single day; a single, larger bank could be purchased for the same price.

Lawsuits 
As of 2019, FuelRod announced that it would begin charging a fee of $3 per swap, sparking outrage among buyers who were promised ‘free swaps’ with their $30 purchase. The rage resulted in numerous lawsuits that prompted the company to come up with the “founders” status, which would allow you to use a code on the kiosks to continue their previously promised free swaps. However, the application needed to gain this status ended in October of 2020 and is no longer available. As of November 2019, kiosks at Disneyland and Universal Studios no longer charge a fee.

References

External links 
 
Battery chargers